Kazeem Babatunde (born 1 January 1984 in Nigeria) is a Nigerian former professional footballer who is last known to have been contracted to Prime F.C. in his home country.

Singapore

Switching to Young Lions alongside two other Nigerians, Itimi Dickson and Precious Emuejeraye, for the 2004 Singapore S.League, Babatunde failed to make a discernible impact during his days there and was released mid-season.

References 

Association football forwards
Young Lions FC players
Singapore Premier League players
Living people
1984 births
Nigerian footballers
Nigerian expatriate footballers
Expatriate footballers in Singapore